Murder at Site 3 is a Hammer movie from 1958, featuring the character of Sexton Blake.  It stars Barbara Shelley, Geoffrey Toone and John Warwick.

Plot

Sexton Blake tracks down a gang who have stolen secrets from a rocket site.

Cast

 Geoffrey Toone as Sexton Blake
 Barbara Shelley as Susan
 John Warwick as Commander Chambers
 Richard Burrell as Tinker
 Jill Melford as Paula Dane

References

External links
 

1958 films
1950s crime thriller films
British crime thriller films
British black-and-white films
British detective films
Films based on crime novels
Films based on British novels
Hammer Film Productions films
Films directed by Francis Searle
Sexton Blake films
1950s English-language films
1950s British films